In mathematics, a stable vector bundle is a (holomorphic or algebraic) vector bundle that is stable in the sense of geometric invariant theory. Any holomorphic vector bundle may be built from stable ones using Harder–Narasimhan filtration.

Motivation 
One of the motivations for analyzing stable vector bundles is their nice behavior in families. In fact, Moduli spaces of stable vector bundles can be constructed using the Quot scheme in many cases, whereas the stack of vector bundles  is an Artin stack whose underlying set is a single point.

Here's an example of a family of vector bundles which degenerate poorly. This kind of jumping of numerical invariants does not happen in moduli spaces of stable vector bundles.

Stable vector bundles over curves 

A slope of a holomorphic vector bundle W over a nonsingular algebraic curve (or over a Riemann surface) is a rational number μ(W) = deg(W)/rank(W). A bundle W is stable if and only if

for all proper non-zero subbundles V of W 
and is semistable if

for all proper non-zero subbundles V of W. Informally this says that a bundle is stable if it is "more ample" than any proper subbundle, and is unstable if it contains a "more ample" subbundle.

If W and V are semistable vector bundles and μ(W) >μ(V), then there are no nonzero maps W → V.

Mumford proved that the moduli space of stable bundles of given rank and degree over a nonsingular curve is a quasiprojective algebraic variety. The cohomology of the moduli space of stable vector bundles over a curve was described by  using algebraic geometry over finite fields and  using Narasimhan-Seshadri approach.

Stable vector bundles in higher dimensions
If X is a smooth projective variety of dimension m and H is a hyperplane section, then a vector bundle (or a torsion-free sheaf) W is called stable (or sometimes Gieseker stable) if

for all proper non-zero subbundles (or subsheaves) V of W, where χ denotes the Euler characteristic of an algebraic vector bundle and the vector bundle V(nH) means the n-th twist of V by H. W is called semistable if the above holds with < replaced by ≤.

Slope stability

For bundles on curves the stability defined by slopes and by growth of Hilbert polynomial coincide. In higher dimensions, these two notions are different and have different advantages. Gieseker stability has an interpretation in terms of geometric invariant theory, while μ-stability has better properties for tensor products, pullbacks, etc.

Let X be a smooth projective variety of dimension n, H its hyperplane section. A slope of a vector bundle (or, more generally, a torsion-free coherent sheaf) E with respect to H is a rational number defined as

where c1 is the first Chern class. The dependence on H is often omitted from the notation.

A torsion-free coherent sheaf E is μ-semistable if for any nonzero subsheaf F ⊆ E the slopes satisfy the inequality μ(F) ≤ μ(E). It's μ-stable if, in addition, for any nonzero subsheaf F ⊆ E of smaller rank the strict inequality μ(F) < μ(E) holds. This notion of stability may be called slope stability, μ-stability, occasionally Mumford stability or Takemoto stability.

For a vector bundle E the following chain of implications holds: E is μ-stable ⇒ E is stable ⇒ E is semistable ⇒ E is μ-semistable.

Harder-Narasimhan filtration

Let E be a vector bundle over a smooth projective curve X. Then there exists a unique filtration by subbundles

such that the associated graded components Fi := Ei+1/Ei are semistable vector bundles and the slopes decrease, μ(Fi) > μ(Fi+1). Two vector bundles with isomorphic associated gradeds are called S-equivalent.

On higher-dimensional varieties the filtration also always exist and is unique, but the associated graded components may no longer be bundles. For Gieseker stability the inequalities between slopes should be replaced with inequalities between Hilbert polynomials.

Kobayashi–Hitchin correspondence

Narasimhan–Seshadri theorem says that stable bundles on a projective nonsingular curve are the same as those that have projectively flat unitary irreducible connections. For bundles of degree 0 projectively flat connections are flat and thus stable bundles of degree 0 correspond to irreducible unitary representations of the fundamental group.

Kobayashi and Hitchin conjectured an analogue of this in higher dimensions.

Generalizations

It's possible to generalize (μ-)stability to non-smooth projective schemes and more general coherent sheaves using the Hilbert polynomial. Let X be a projective scheme, d a natural number, E a coherent sheaf on X with dim Supp(E) = d. Write the Hilbert polynomial of E as PE(m) =  αi(E)/(i!) mi. Define the reduced Hilbert polynomial pE := PE/αd(E).

A coherent sheaf E is semistable if the following two conditions hold:
 E is pure of dimension d, i.e. all associated primes of E have dimension d;
 for any proper nonzero subsheaf F ⊆ E the reduced Hilbert polynomials satisfy pF(m) ≤ pE(m) for large m.
A sheaf is called stable if the strict inequality pF(m) < pE(m) holds for large m.

Let Cohd(X) be the full subcategory of coherent sheaves on X with support of dimension ≤ d. The slope of an object F in Cohd may be defined using the coefficients of the Hilbert polynomial as  if αd(F) ≠ 0 and 0 otherwise.

the torsion of E is in dimension ≤ d-2;
for any nonzero subobject F ⊆ E in the quotient category Cohd(X)/Cohd-1(X) we have .
E is μ-stable if the strict inequality holds for all proper nonzero subobjects of E.

Note that Cohd is a Serre subcategory for any d, so the quotient category exists. A subobject in the quotient category in general doesn't come from a subsheaf, but for torsion-free sheaves the original definition and the general one for d = n are equivalent.

There are also other directions for generalizations, for example Bridgeland's stability conditions.

One may define stable principal bundles in analogy with stable vector bundles.

See also
 Kobayashi–Hitchin correspondence
 Corlette–Simpson correspondence
Quot scheme

References

 especially appendix 5C.

Algebraic geometry